Paramobula is an extinct genus of ray in the family Myliobatidae (eagle rays). The genus was erected by Pfeil in 1981 to accommodate a fossil species first described from a number of teeth with distinctive characteristics found in the Chandler Bridge Formation in South Carolina. The species was originally described by Cappetta in 1970 as Manta fragilis but differed significantly from other Manta species. Paramobula fragilis dates back to the late Oligocene.

References

Myliobatidae
Fossil taxa described in 1970